Pinchus Krémègne, aka Pinchus Kremegne (28 July 1890 – 5 April 1981), was a Lithuanian Jewish-French artist, primarily known as a sculptor, painter and lithographer.

He was a native of Zhaludak near Lida, and was a friend of both Chaïm Soutine and Michel Kikoine. He studied sculpture at the Vilnius Academy of Art. He became a target of the pogroms because he was a Jew and fled to Paris in 1912. In Paris, Kremegne joined the group of painters of Montparnasse and soon became one of the respected residents of La Ruche. In 1915, he gave up sculpture in order to dedicate himself to painting. It was he who encouraged Soutine to come to Paris. He left Paris to live in a small town in the Pyrenees called Ceret. This village, which is a little inland from Collioure, attracted other painters such as Soutine. Although Soutine did not like the town very much, he completed many paintings there over a couple of years. He never settled but his compatriot Kremegne had a house built there around 1960. This small unassuming house, a reflection of the man himself, is nestled into the mountain and overlooks the village.

There was a falling out between the two men perhaps stemming from some ingratitude shown by Soutine towards a mutual 'mecene' or benefactor who had helped out the two impoverished artists during their early careers in Paris. Kremegne's house has new occupants and it is called La Miranda del Convent. Later Ceret was to attract other painters such as Picasso. The Picasso walk meanders by Kremegne's house and Ceret has an important museum exhibiting artists such as Matisse, Picasso, and others. There are a few Kremegne paintings on exhibition there as well.

Kremegne died in Ceret.

Underestimated as an artist today, he is overshadowed by Soutine and Chagall. He was remembered with a posthumous one-man show in the Quartier Les Halles in Paris in the 1990s. A more structured vision of nature than Soutine's, Kremegne's last paintings prefigure the work of painters such as Leon Kossoff and Frank Auerbach in England.

References

1890 births
1981 deaths
People from Lida District
Belarusian Jews
Modern painters
Jewish painters
Jewish sculptors
Belarusian painters
Belarusian sculptors
Russian painters
Russian male painters
20th-century Russian sculptors
20th-century Russian male artists
Russian male sculptors
20th-century French painters
French male painters
Emigrants from the Russian Empire to France
School of Paris
Vilnius Academy of Arts alumni
20th-century French sculptors
French male sculptors